Flagman may refer to:

 Flagman (rail), an employee of the railroad who is assigned to protect anyone performing work on a railroad right of way
 Flagman, a Nintendo Game & Watch game
 Traffic guard, people who set up warning signs and barricades to slow down the speed of traffic